Bucculatrix taeniola is a moth in the family Bucculatricidae. It is found in North America, where it has been recorded from California. The species was described by Annette Frances Braun in 1963.

The larvae feed on white sage, which could refer to Salvia apiana or Eurotia lanata.

References
Notes

Sources
Natural History Museum Lepidoptera generic names catalog

Bucculatricidae
Moths described in 1963
Moths of North America
Taxa named by Annette Frances Braun